Thomas "Nogga" Norgren (born 8 December 1961) is a Swedish curler and curling coach.

In 1995 he was inducted into the Swedish Curling Hall of Fame.

Teams

Record as a coach of national teams

References

External links
 

Living people
1961 births
Swedish male curlers
European curling champions
Swedish curling champions
Swedish curling coaches
20th-century Swedish people